Sheehan Donoghue is a former member of the Wisconsin State Assembly.

Biography
Donoghue was born on December 13, 1943, in Hamilton, Ohio. She graduated from high school in Merrill, Wisconsin and from the University of Wisconsin–Madison.

Career
Donoghue was first elected to the Wisconsin Assembly in 1972, representing Langlade County, Lincoln County, and the western half of Oneida County.  She was re-elected five times, serving 12 years total. She is a Republican.

Electoral history

| colspan="6" style="text-align:center;background-color: #e9e9e9;"| Primary Election

| colspan="6" style="text-align:center;background-color: #e9e9e9;"| General Election

| colspan="6" style="text-align:center;background-color: #e9e9e9;"| Primary Election

| colspan="6" style="text-align:center;background-color: #e9e9e9;"| General Election

| colspan="6" style="text-align:center;background-color: #e9e9e9;"| Primary Election

| colspan="6" style="text-align:center;background-color: #e9e9e9;"| General Election

| colspan="6" style="text-align:center;background-color: #e9e9e9;"| Primary Election

| colspan="6" style="text-align:center;background-color: #e9e9e9;"| General Election

| colspan="6" style="text-align:center;background-color: #e9e9e9;"| Primary Election

| colspan="6" style="text-align:center;background-color: #e9e9e9;"| General Election

| colspan="6" style="text-align:center;background-color: #e9e9e9;"| Primary Election

| colspan="6" style="text-align:center;background-color: #e9e9e9;"| General Election

References

Politicians from Hamilton, Ohio
People from Merrill, Wisconsin
Republican Party members of the Wisconsin State Assembly
University of Wisconsin–Madison alumni
1943 births
Living people